Pintado means "painted" in Spanish and Portuguese and may refer to:

Cape petrel, also known as pintado petrel, a seabird whose range includes Antarctica and New Zealand
Spotted sorubim Pseudoplatystoma corruscans, a catfish-like species of South American rivers
(less often:) tiger sorubim Pseudoplatystoma fasciatum, known as cachara throughout most of Brazil but as pintado in the Amazon region
 Cero Scomberomorus regalis, a large, spotted, mackerel-like fish, whose range includes the Florida coast and the West Indies, after which two USS Pintado ships were named
  (1943-1969), a Balao class-submarine named for the fish
  (1967-1998), a Sturgeon-class attack submarine named for the fish
 Cerro Pintado, a mountain in South America
 A sombrero pintado, a style of Panama hat
Pintados, a used by Spanish colonists to describe indigenous people with tattooed bodies residing on the islands of Cebu, Bohol, Samar and Leyte in the Biçayas (Visayas) region of the Philippines
Luiz Carlos de Oliveira Preto, mostly known as Pintado, a Brazilian former footballer and manager.